Charles McDonald Griffith is a Barbadian politician. He is a member of Parliament in the Barbados Parliament and former Minister in the Ministry of Water Resources of Barbados in the government of Mia Mottley. He was reassigned to the portfolio of Minister of Youth, Sports and Community Empowerment in January 2022. He is representing the Saint John constituency, Barbados.

References 

Year of birth missing (living people)

Living people

People from Saint John, Barbados